Xamaba is the supreme being of the Heikum of South Africa. Creator of all things, including humanity, he is a benevolent figure who is invoked for help when ill and when traveling and is said to provide the rain.

African gods
Creator gods
Rain deities